Pryor Convictions: And Other Life Sentences is an autobiography by the American comedian Richard Pryor. The book was published in 1995. Included are details of Pryor's rough childhood growing up in his mother's brothel, his drug problems, his seven marriages, his self-immolation, his life dealing with multiple sclerosis, and his stand-up career.

References 

1995 non-fiction books
African-American autobiographies
Books about entertainers
Richard Pryor